The 2004 French Open girls' singles tournament was an event during the 2004 French Open tennis tournament. Anna-Lena Grönefeld was the defending champion, but did not compete in the Juniors in this year.

Sesil Karatantcheva won in the final 6–4, 6–0, against Mădălina Gojnea.

Seeds 

  Sessil Karatantcheva (champion)
  Jarmila Gajdosova (first round)
  Shahar Pe'er (quarterfinals)
  Michaëlla Krajicek (quarterfinals)
  Timea Bacsinszky (semifinals)
  Kateryna Bondarenko (semifinals)
  Yung-Jan Chan (first round)
  Elena Vesnina (quarterfinals)
  Kateřina Böhmová (third round)
  Veronika Chvojková (first round)
  Marina Erakovic (first round)
  Monica Niculescu (third round)
  Victoria Azarenka (third round)
  Alla Kudryavtseva (third round)
  Angelique Kerber (first round)
  Pauline Parmentier (second round)

Draw

Finals

Top half

Section 1

Section 2

Bottom half

Section 3

Section 4

Sources 
 ITF Tennis

Girls' Singles
French Open, 2004 Girls' Singles